Black Wolf is a fantasy novel by Dave Gross, set in the world of the Forgotten Realms, and based on the Dungeons & Dragons role-playing game. It is the fourth novel in the "Sembia: Gateway To The Realms" series. It was published in paperback in November 2001.

Plot summary
Talbot Uskevren will need to use his sword fighting and acting skills to survive against the Black Brotherhood.

Reception
In a mostly positive review, Don D'Ammassa opined that Gross's "prose is above average for this publisher, and his evocation of the culture of the imagined land is also quite well done."

References

External links 
 

2001 American novels
Forgotten Realms novels